Benyamin Nuss (born 20 June 1989) is a German pianist and composer.

Life

Nuss was born in Bergisch Gladbach, Germany. He began playing the piano at age 6 in 1995 and was taught and supported by his then teacher Viktor Langemann. He also was greatly supported by his father, the internationally renowned Jazz trombonist Ludwig Nuss. With a good environment, he grew up with music from different genres. Later, inspired by “Doctor Gradus ad Parnassum” from “Children’s Corner,” he began at the age of ten to study the composer Claude Debussy, and soon after the works of Maurice Ravel.

In 2004, Nuss was taught privately with concert-pianist Andreas Frölich in Bonn, Germany, and later changed teachers to Ilja Scheps as a youth-student. After high school, Nuss studied at the Hochschule für Musik Köln and graduated with a Bachelor in Music. He visited masterclasses there with Anatol Ugorski, Einar Steen-Nokleberg and Ragna Schirmer.

Through his success in German national music competition Jugend Musiziert, Nuss was invited to play concerts with the Youth Orchestra of North Rhine-Westphalia. In 2006, Nuss received a stipendium from the Werner Richard - Dr. Carl Dörken Stiftung and played recitals and concerts with different orchestras of North Rhine-Westphalia. In 2008, he was chosen for "Best of NRW", which allowed him to play twelve concerts in diverse concert halls in North Rhine-Westphalia.

Besides his love for classical music and jazz, he always had a passion for videogames and videogame music. He was the featured soloist in the award-winning Symphonic Fantasies and Distant Worlds: Music from Final Fantasy concerts in Tokyo, Chicago, Cologne and Stockholm. Additionally, his first soundtrack released was a tribute to Japanese composer Nobuo Uematsu, the former composer of the Japanese video game series, Final Fantasy.

In 2010, Benyamin did a tour through Germany, where he played again in many major concert halls, among them the Berliner Philharmonie, Frankfurt Alte Oper, Hamburg Laeiszhalle, Stuttgart "Liederhalle" and many more. Since then, Nuss has played solo performances on TV, like in “Stars von Morgen” with Rolando Villazón and performed in front of German Chancellor, Angela Merkel.

In 2012, he recorded his second album, titled Exotica, which was followed by concerts in Tokyo and Singapore. Afterwards, did recordings and concerts for radio stations, performing Gershwin's “Concert For Piano in F” with the Deutsche Radio Philharmonie – Saarbrücken, Rhapsody In Blue, and Ravel's Piano Concerto Nr.2 with the WDR Rundfunk Orchester.

Lately, he has worked in close collaboration with Japanese composer Masashi Hamauzu, performing his compositions in Piano Works Delta/Epsilon/T_Comp1 (2013), Opus 4 Piano and Chamber Music Works (2014), and also some pieces in Benyamin's own album Exotica. Both of these were not released in any soundtrack, and are found only on his official YouTube channel.

Nuss performed piano at a Fanfest event for the Japanese MMORPG Final Fantasy XIV in 2017 in Frankfurt, Germany, performing alongside vocalist Susan Calloway in a concert performance playing a number of popular music tracks from the Final Fantasy XIV game. 
Nuss was praised by Japanese composer Nobuo Uematsu at the event for his piano performance citing his passion for both the piano and the music he played.

Nuss performed piano at another Fanfest event in 2019 in Paris, France, performing alongside vocalist Susan Calloway in a concert performance playing some news tracks from Final Fantasy XIV.

Albums
 2010 – Benyamin Nuss Plays Uematsu; Deutsche Grammophon
 2012 – Exotica; Deutsche Grammophon
 with works by Claude Debussy, Darius Milhaud, Heitor Villa-Lobos, Alberto Ginastera, Charles T. Griffes, Mily Balakirev, Alan Hovhaness, Alexandre Tansman, Martin Torp, Benyamin Nuss, Jonne Valtonen and Masashi Hamauzu
 2014 – Masashi Hamauzu: Opus 4, with Lisa Schumann (Violin) and Kana Shirao (Cello); Mons Records
 2015 – Paul Juon: Silhouettes op. 9 and op. 43, Sieben kleine Tondichtungen op. 81, with Malwina Sosnowski (Violin) und Rebekka Hartmann (Violin); Musiques Suisses
 2016 – Nikolai Kapustin: Works for Cello, with Christine Rauh (cello); SWR Music
 2018 – Mia Brentano’s Hidden Sea: 20 Songs for 2 Pianos, with Max Nyberg (2nd Piano); Mons Records
 2022 – Mia Brentano’s Summerhouse: New Music for 2 Pianos, with Billy Test (2nd Piano); Mons Records

Performances

Video Games
 2013 - Kingdom Hearts HD 1.5 Remix; Performed Lord of the Castle
 2014 - Kingdom Hearts HD 2.5 Remix
 2016 - World of Final Fantasy
 2017 - Kingdom Hearts Orchestra -World Tour-

References

External links
Official website

1989 births
German composers
German male composers
German pianists
Living people
People from Bergisch Gladbach
German male pianists
21st-century pianists
21st-century German male musicians